Live!! New York City 10/14/94 is a 1994 live album by They Might Be Giants which reproduced a concert given by the band on October 14 of the same year.

Track listing
 "Introduction" (speech) - 0:41
 "O, Do Not Forsake Me" - 2:23
 "Don't Let's Start" - 2:42
 "AKA Driver" - 3:06
 "We'll Be Right Back" (speech) - 0:18
 "Welcome Back" (speech) - 0:15
 "Why Does the Sun Shine? (The Sun Is a Mass of Incandescent Gas)" - 2:37
 "Purple Toupee" - 2:48
 "Sleeping in the Flowers" - 4:16
 "Chess Piece Face" - 1:40
 "Particle Man" - 2:17
 "She's an Angel" - 2:57
 "The Statue Got Me High" - 3:29
 "Band Intros" (speech) - 2:56
 "Whistling in the Dark" - 2:39
 "Ana Ng" - 3:20
 "We'll Be Right Back" (speech) - 0:22
 "Welcome Back" (speech) - 0:19
 "Turn Around" - 3:07
 "I Palindrome I" - 2:38
 "Birdhouse in Your Soul" - 3:16
 "Snail Shell" - 3:12
 "Twistin'" - 2:27
 "Dig My Grave" - 1:23
 "Goodnight" (speech) - 0:39
 "Cepastat Spot" (speech) - 0:05

External links
Live!! New York City 10/14/94 at This Might Be A Wiki

They Might Be Giants live albums
1994 live albums
Elektra Records live albums